Bashman (also Romanized as Bashm and Beshm; also known as Bashan) is a village in Chahar Farizeh Rural District, in the Central District of Bandar-e Anzali County, Gilan Province, Iran. At the 2006 census, its population was 1,405, in 416 families.

References 

Populated places in Bandar-e Anzali County